Micro power sources  and nano power sources are units of RFID, MEMS, microsystems and nanosystems for energy-power generation, harvesting from ambient, storage and conversion.

References

[1]  La O` G.J., In H.J., Crumlin E., Barbastathis G., Shao-Horn Y. Resent advances in microdevices for electrochemical energy conversion and storage // Int. J. Energy Res. 2007. V.31. P.548-575.

[2] Curtright A.E., Bouwman P.J., Wartena R.C., Swider-Lyons K.E. Power sources for nanotechnology // International Journal of Nanotechnology. 2004. V.1. Nos.1/2. P.226-239

Energy technology
Microtechnology